Lake Fern is an unincorporated community in Hillsborough County, Florida,  United States.  Although a separate community, it is a part of the census-designated place (CDP) of Keystone. The ZIP code for the community is 33556. In 2000, it was part of the Citrus Park-Fern Lake [sic] census county division (CCD), which recorded an estimate population of 117,574 in 2007.

Geography
Lake Fern is located at 28.14944 degrees north, 82.57972  degrees west (28.14944, -82.57972), and 62 feet above sea level.

Education
The community of Lake Fern is served by Hillsborough County Public Schools.

References

Unincorporated communities in Hillsborough County, Florida
Unincorporated communities in Florida